The International programme of Croatian Radio "Voice of Croatia" is the international service of Croatian state radio via satellite and Internet.

The programme is for Croatians living abroad, Croatia's minority groups and the international community. While mostly in Croatian, news and segments of up to 15 minutes duration are broadcast in English, German, Italian, Hungarian, and Spanish at different times of the day.

History
On January 1, 2013, Voice of Croatia ceased broadcasting over shortwave. and also stopped transmitting from Zadar on AM (1134 kHz, covering Europe) on January 1, 2014. Prior to leaving shortwave, transmitters in Germany were rented to reach audiences in the Americas, while the Pacific region was covered for four hours daily via the relay station in Singapore.

Satellite broadcasts
The Voice of Croatia broadcasts 24 hours a day via the following satellites:
 In Europe, North Africa, the Middle East on the Eutelsat 13C at 13°E and Eutelsat 16A at 16 degrees east for Central and East Europe.

Previous Shortwave frequencies
As logged on November 2010:

3985 kHz (21:30–06:00 UTC for Europe)
6165 kHz (06:00–08:00 and 15:00–21:30 UTC for Europe)
7370 kHz (08:00–15:00 UTC for Europe)
7375 kHz (23:00–04:00 UTC for South America; 00:00–06:00 UTC for North America)
17860 kHz (07:00–11:00 UTC for Australia)

See also
Croatian Radiotelevision
List of radio stations in Croatia
List of international radio broadcasters

References

External links
Croatian Radio-Television Website 
Voice of Croatia Schedule 
Listen Voice of Croatia 

International broadcasters
Radio stations in Croatia
Shortwave radio stations